Bujerere, is a settlement in the Western Region of Uganda.

Location
Bujerere is located on the eastern banks of the Lamia River, in Bundibugyo District, across the international border with the Democratic Republic of the Congo. The coordinates of Bujerere are 0°37'53.0"N, 29°57'33.0"E (Latitude:0.631389; Longitude:29.959167).

Overview
Bujerere marks the western end of the  Fort Portal–Bundibugyo–Lamia Road.

See also
Rwenzori Mountains
Bundibugyo Airport

References

External links

Populated places in Western Region, Uganda
Cities in the Great Rift Valley
Bundibugyo District
Democratic Republic of the Congo–Uganda border crossings